Wayne Radford may refer to:

 Wayne Radford (basketball) (1956–2021), American professional basketball player
 Wayne Radford (cricketer) (born 1958), South African former cricketer